Muižnieks  (Old orthography: Muischneek; feminine: Muižniece) is a Latvian language occupational surname. Individuals with the surname include:

Valdis Muižnieks (1935–2013), Latvian basketball player
Nils Muižnieks (1964), Latvian-American human rights activist and political scientist
Kārlis Muižnieks (1964), former basketball player
Vineta Muižniece (1956), Latvian jurist and politician
Anete Muižniece-Brice (1962), Latvian former basketball player

Latvian-language masculine surnames
Occupational surnames